Expressway S11 or express road S11 (in Polish droga ekspresowa S11) is a major road in Poland which has been planned to run from Kołobrzeg on the Baltic coast through Koszalin, Piła and Poznań to Pyrzowice (north of Katowice), a distance of about 550 km, largely following the route of existing National road 11 (DK11). A few short sections of the expressway exist or are under construction, but the bulk of it should be built only after 2020 as it has a lower priority than other express roads and motorways currently planned, with the precise construction timeline highly dependent on government funding decisions.  As of November 2017, 40.3 km (25 mi) of road was built out of the total planned length of 600 km (373 mi).

The only sections which have high priority are those which serve as bypasses of the city of Poznań. In June 2012, the whole of the S11 between DK92 and the A2 motorway opened to traffic. This stretch of the expressway serves as the western bypass of Poznań and provides faster access to Poznań's airport, as well as diverting most of the traffic away from Poznań's congested city centre. The section which serves as the city's western bypass was completed in 2014.

In 2023 the section from Koszalin to Bobolice (47.8 km) as well as the bypass of Olesno (24.8 km) are expected to be completed.

References 

Expressways in Poland
Proposed roads in Poland